The National Archives of Eritrea are the national archives of Eritrea. They are located in Asmara.

See also 
 List of national archives

External links 
 http://www.eritreanarchives.org

Eritrea
Archives in Eritrea
Buildings and structures in Asmara